Dariusz Marian Libionka (born on 25 June 1963 in Bielsko-Biała) is a Polish historian affiliated with the Institute of National Remembrance in Lublin. Libionka graduated from the Catholic University of Lublin (KUL)  and the School for Social Science of the Institute of Philosophy and Sociology of the Polish Academy of Sciences. His research interests include the Polish-Jewish relations and history of Poland after 1945, with special focus on the status of the Jewish community in Poland throughout 20th century: in the Second Polish Republic, in the General Government formed by Nazi Germany, and in the Polish People's Republic after World War II, as well as, all matters of the Polish-Jewish relations and Judaism in Poland.

From 1994, Libionka worked in the Polish Contemporary History section of the Institute of History of the Academy of Sciences and, since 2000, in the Bureau of Public Education of the Institute of National Remembrance (Instytut Pamieci Narodowej) in Lublin.  His articles appeared in "Dzieje Najnowsze”, "Biuletyn ŻIH”, "Polska 1944/1945-1999”, "Tygodnik Powszechny" and in "Yad Vashem Studies”. In 1998 he wrote his Ph.D. dissertation "The 'Jewish Question' in Polish catholic Press in the 1930s."

Publications
"Polska ludność chrześcijańska wobec eksterminacji Żydów – dystrykt lubelski" (Polish-Christian Population and the Nazi Extermination of Jews in Lublin District)
Armia Krajowa i Delegatura Rządu wobec eksterminacji Żydów; Kościół katolicki, antysemityzm, Zagłada (The Home Army, the Delegatura and the Holocaust; The Catholic Church, antisemitism and the Holocaust)
„Aktion Reinhardt” The Extermination of the Jews in the General Government; editor

Articles 
 Kwestia żydowska – myślenie za pomocą clichés. Przypadek “Odrodzenia” 1935-1939, „Dzieje Najnowsze” 1995, nr 3.
 The Catholic Church in Poland and the Holocaust, 1939-1945 [in] The Holocaust and the Christian World, ed. C. Ritter, S. D. Smith, I. Steinfeld, London 2000.
 Die Kirche in Polen und der Mord an den Juden im Licht der polnischen Publizistik und Historiographie nach 1945, „Zeitschrift für Ostmitteleuropa – Forschung“ 2002, nr 2.
 Obcy, wrodzy, niebezpieczni. Obraz Żydów i „kwestii żydowskiej” na łamach prasy inteligencji katolickiej w latach trzydziestych, „Kwartalnik Historii Żydów” 2002, nr 3.
 Brakujące ogniwo. Sowiecka literatura antysyjonistyczna w Polsce przed i po Marcu 1968 [in] Komunizm. Ideologia , system, ludzie, edited by T. Szarota, Warszawa 2001.
 Duchowieństwo diecezji łomżyńskiej wobec antysemityzmu i zagłady Żydów [in] Wokół Jedwabnego, edited by P. Machcewicz and Krzysztof Persak, Warszawa 2002.

References

External links 
About dr Dariusz Libionka at the Polish Center for Holocaust Research
Yad Vashem Studies XXXIV
Dariusz Libionka at Yad Vashem The Holocaust Remembrance Authority
"Deconstructing Memory and History" by Dariusz Libionka and Laurence Weinbaum at the Jewish Political Studies Review

1963 births
Living people
20th-century Polish historians
Polish male non-fiction writers
People associated with the Institute of National Remembrance
People from Bielsko-Biała
John Paul II Catholic University of Lublin alumni
21st-century Polish historians